Early Winter  is a 2015 Canadian-Australian drama film written and directed by Michael Rowe. It was awarded Best Film in the Venice Days section at the 72nd Venice International Film Festival.

Plot 

A man lives a predictable life with his wife and children, but begins to suspect that his wife is having an affair.

Cast 

    Suzanne Clément 	as Maya 
 Paul Doucet 	as David 
 Ambrosio De Luca 	as Maxime 
 Max Laferriere 	as André 
 Michael Riendeau 	as Sergei  
 Alexandre Marine 	as Alexandre

References

External links  

Early Winter at Library and Archives Canada

2015 drama films
2015 films
Australian drama films
Canadian drama films
English-language Canadian films
2010s English-language films
2010s Canadian films
2010s Australian films